Oxycrepis crenata is a species of ground beetle in the family Carabidae. It is found in North America.

References

Harpalinae
Articles created by Qbugbot

Beetles described in 1852